The 2014 Berlin Marathon was the 41st edition of the Berlin Marathon. The marathon took place in Berlin, Germany, on 28 September 2014 and was the fourth World Marathon Majors race of the year.

The men's race was won by Kenyan athlete Dennis Kimetto in a world record time of 2:02:57, breaking the previous record of Wilson Kipsang by 26 seconds. Kimetto's performance means that the last six men's world records at the distance have all been set at the Berlin Marathon. Runner-up Emmanuel Mutai also surpassed Kipsang's old mark, finishing in 2:03:13. En route to his second-place finish, Mutai set a world record at the 30K distance (1:27:37).

The women's race was won by Tirfi Tsegaye of Ethiopia in a time of 2:20:18 hours.

Finishing third in a time of 2:21:14, Shalane Flanagan became the second fastest American woman at the marathon distance. Flanagan passed the 25K mark in 1:22:36, surpassing Janet Bawcom's previous American 25K record of 1:24:36.

Results

Men

Other notable finishers
Scott Overall: 14th
Kazuhiro Maeda: 16th

Women

Other notable finishers
Natalia Romero: 13th
Helena Javornik: 40th

Wheelchair men

Wheelchair women

References

External links
41st BMW Berlin Marathon

Berlin Marathon
Berlin Marathon
2014 in Berlin
Berlin Marathon
September 2014 sports events in Germany